The Campanha Central micro-region (Microrregião de Campanha Central, meaning the central fields in Portuguese) is a microregion in the western part of the state of Rio Grande do Sul, Brazil.

Municipalities 
The microregion consists of the following municipalities:
 Rosário do Sul
 Santa Margarida do Sul
 Santana do Livramento
 São Gabriel

References

Microregions of Rio Grande do Sul